Şükraniye can refer to:

 Şükraniye, Bilecik
 Şükraniye, Kestel